Hypocala velans is a moth of the family Erebidae. It was first described by Francis Walker in 1857. It is endemic to the Hawaiian islands of Kauai, Oahu, Molokai, Maui and Hawaii. It was thought to be extinct until a single specimen was collected at Puʻu Waʻawaʻa in April 1995.

Adults of this species are known to roost in caves.

The larvae feed on Maba sandwicensis. Full-grown caterpillars are about 40 mm and have a fuscous-brown color which is nearly uniform, but on close examination is found to be made up of dark fuscous or black with numerous crinkled longitudinal lines of a lavender color.

External links

Hypocalinae